Re:T-ara (stylized as Re:T-ARA) is the second single album by South Korean girl group T-ara. It was released on November 15, 2021 by Dingo Music, and distributed by Dreamus. It marks the group's first release after a 4 year hiatus following the EP What's My Name? (2017). The single consists of two tracks: "All Kill" and the lead single "Tiki Taka".

Background
On July 29, it was announced through the group's 12th anniversary V-Live that they would be making their first comeback in four years before the winter of 2021. It was later revealed that the group will collaborate with Dingo Music to make their comeback with the single album Re:T-ara on November 15, 2021.  The album consists of two tracks: "All Kill" and "Tiki Taka".

Release
The album was released on November 15 through many Korean online music services, including Melon. For the global market, the album was made available on iTunes. It was also released in physical format.

Music video 
On November 12, a first teaser for the music video of "Tiki Taka" was released.  On November 14, the second teaser for the music video was released. On November 15, The official music video of "Tiki Taka" was released.

Track listing 
Credits adapted from Naver.

Charts

Awards and nominations

Lists

Release history

References

Single albums
2021 EPs
T-ara albums